Kuchek Mahalleh (also Romanized as Kūchek Maḩalleh; also known as Bālā Maḩalleh Sangāchīn and Bālā Maḩalleh Sangarchīn) is a village in Chahar Farizeh Rural District, in the Central District of Bandar-e Anzali County, Gilan Province, Iran. At the 2006 census, its population was 362, in 97 families.

References 

Populated places in Bandar-e Anzali County